May Than Nu (born on 27 January 1961) is a Burmese film actress. She has won 5 Myanmar Academy Awards throughout her career.

Biography

May Than Nu was born Than Than Hsint (သန်းသန်းဆင့်) in Mergui, Tenasserim Division, Burma (now Myeik, Myanmar) on 27 January 1961. She debuted with the film Thingyan Moe, playing the daughter of Khin Than Nu.

Controversy
She was arrested to the court for the misconducted and fraud the money from her close business friend so one year jail penalty by Yankin Court on 2 January 2020, and another being accused like the same case is still facing by the Kamaryut and Thingyangan Court in February 2020.

Personal life

May Than Nu was previously married to Sin Yaw Mg Mg, with whom she has a son, Min Thant Maung Maung, a film director.

Filmography

Films
Thingyan Moe (1985)
Ta Pyi Thu Ma Shwe Htar (1994)
Never Shall We Be Enslaved (1997)
A May Chay Yar (1997)
Kyan Sit Min (2005)
Yadana (2006)
Kyauk Sat Yay (2009)
Eternal Mother (2017)
Hit Tine (2019)

Awards and nominations

References

External links
 
 

Living people
1961 births
Burmese film actresses
People from Tanintharyi Region
20th-century Burmese actresses
21st-century Burmese actresses